Madrepora tenuis is an unaccepted scientific name and may refer to two species of corals:
 Acropora tenuis as described by Dana, 1846
 Madrepora oculata as described by Linnaeus, 1758